Mand is a small village of Mandla district, Madhya Pradesh, India. This village is about 30 km from main city Mandla and in National Highway 30(Old 12A).

Demographics
As of 2011 India census Mand has a population of 2029. Males constitute 52.36% of the population.

Educational institutes
Govt. High School Mand.
Govt. Middle School Mand.
Saraswati Shishu Mandir Mand.
Govt. Boys' Primary School Mand.
Govt. Girls' Primary School Mand.

Temples
Shri Shitala Mata Mandir,
Shri Sankatmochan Hanumaan Mandir,
Shri Sai Baba Mandir,
Shri Mahadev Mandir.
Shri Shani Dev Mandir,
Shri Siddh Baba Mandir
Shri Siddh Tekri
Shri Durga Mata Mandir

Climate

References
Census of India, Village Mand Gram Panchayat

Villages in Mandla district